Goyongo Airport  is an airstrip serving Goyongo, a hamlet in Nord-Ubangi Province, Democratic Republic of the Congo.

See also

Transport in the Democratic Republic of the Congo
List of airports in the Democratic Republic of the Congo

References

External links
 OpenStreetMap - Goyongo Airport
 FallingRain - Goyongo
 OurAirports - Goyongo Airport

Airports in the Nord-Ubangi Province